Morten Jensen (born 1 March 1997) is a Danish professional ice hockey defenceman currently playing for HC Pustertal of the ICE Hockey League.

References

External links
 

1997 births
Living people
Kristianstads IK players
Rögle BK players
Danish ice hockey defencemen